France Adamič (4 October 1911 – 5 August 2004) was a [Yugoslav agronomist and author of several books on horticulture. He was professor of arboriculture, pomology and introduction to farming on the university in Ljubljana from 1961 till 1981. He was researching domestic and foreign cultivars of fruit trees, their physiology, the technology of their cultivation, and the organization and economics of fruit tree plantations. Adamič graduated from the University of Belgrade, where he also completed his doctoral studies.

Awards 
 1977: Kidrič Award
 1982: Jesenko Award

Bibliography 
 1961: Sadjarstvo I
 1962: Sadjarstvo II
 1963: Sadjarstvo III
 1971: Naše sadje
 1995: Kmetijski tehniški slovar I/b

References 
 Slovenski veliki leksikon, Mladinska knjiga (2003)
 

1911 births
2004 deaths
Yugoslav agronomists
University of Belgrade Faculty of Agriculture alumni
Pomologists
Arborists
Academic staff of the University of Ljubljana
20th-century agronomists